Dawson Alan Knox (born November 14, 1996) is an American football tight end for the Buffalo Bills of the National Football League (NFL). He played college football at Ole Miss.

Early years
Knox attended St. Paul Christian Academy and Brentwood Academy in Brentwood, Tennessee. He played wide receiver and quarterback for the high school football team. He played in only one game his senior season due to an ankle injury.

College career
Knox joined the University of Mississippi (Ole Miss) as a walk-on fullback in 2015. He played at Ole Miss until 2018. During his career, he had 39 receptions for 605 yards. After his junior season in 2018, he decided to forgo his senior year and enter the 2019 NFL Draft.

Collegiate statistics

Professional career

The Buffalo Bills selected Knox in the third round with the 96th overall pick in the 2019 NFL Draft. Knox signed his rookie contract with the team on June 14, 2019.

On September 22, 2019, Knox caught his first NFL touchdown from Josh Allen against the Cincinnati Bengals in Week 3. He had a hand in the Bills' game-winning drive, catching another reception from Allen for 49 yards and running over two Bengals defenders along the way to set up a touchdown run by Frank Gore. Knox finished with three receptions for 67 yards and a touchdown as the Bills won 21-17. Knox had an up-and-down rookie season, catching 28 of 50 targets for 388 yards and two touchdowns.

On October 24, 2020, Knox was placed on the reserve/COVID-19 list after testing positive for the virus. He was activated on November 5. Knox would play in 12 games, starting seven, in 2020, catching 24 passes for 288 yards and three touchdowns.

In Buffalo's Wild Card Round victory over the Indianapolis Colts, Knox caught two passes for five yards, including a two-yard touchdown from Josh Allen in the first quarter of the Bills' eventual 27–24 victory.
In the AFC Championship against the Kansas City Chiefs, Knox recorded 6 catches for 42 yards and a touchdown during the 38–24 loss.

Knox became a more prominent part of the Bills' passing attack in 2021. During Thanksgiving Day against the New Orleans Saints, he caught two touchdowns to raise his season total to 7, overtaking Buffalo's franchise record for most receiving touchdowns in a season by a tight end.

On September 7, 2022, the Bills signed Knox to a four-year $53.6 million extension, making him one of the top paid tight ends in the league.

NFL career statistics

Regular season

Postseason

Buffalo Bills franchise records
Most touchdown receptions by a tight end, season: 9

Personal life
Knox is a Christian. Knox has partnered with P.U.N.T. Pediatric Cancer Collaborative (the organization founded by former Bills punter Brian Moorman) to support the organization through various initiatives.

Knox's younger brother, Luke Knox, played linebacker for the Ole Miss Rebels and was set to play the 2022 season for the Florida International University Panthers as a graduate transfer. Luke Knox died August 17, 2022 following a sudden hospitalization.

References

External links
Buffalo Bills bio
Ole Miss Rebels bio

1996 births
Living people
People from Brentwood, Tennessee
Players of American football from Tennessee
American football tight ends
Ole Miss Rebels football players
Buffalo Bills players
American Conference Pro Bowl players